Alfred Harold Millar (14 November 1887 – 27 October 1946) was an Australian rules footballer who played for the Geelong Football Club in the Victorian Football League (VFL).

Notes

External links 

1887 births
1946 deaths
Australian rules footballers from Victoria (Australia)
Geelong Football Club players
People educated at Geelong College